William Bertrand Busnach (7 March 1832, Paris – 20 January 1907, Paris) was a French dramatist.

Biography
Busnach was a nephew of the composer Fromental Halévy. His father was associated with David Ben Joseph Coen Bakri, to whom France was indebted to the amount of some twenty-odd million francs for provisions furnished to Napoleon Bonaparte in Egypt. The lawsuit lasted for more than fifty years, and Busnach and his partner were not paid in full at the end. The elder Busnach, an Algerian Jew, became a naturalised Italian in the time of the Deys, and was the first interpreter of the French army. He established himself in Paris in 1835.

William – an Italian Jew born in France of an Algerian father, with a German surname and an English given name – was at first employed in the customs department. He subsequently devoted himself to dramatic work, writing many plays, a number of which have been successful. They include: Les Virtuoses du Pavé, 1864; Première Fraîcheur, Paris-Revue, 1869; Héloïse et Abélard, with music by Henry Litolff, 1872; Forte en Gueule, La Liqueur d'Or, in collaboration with Armand Liorat, music by Laurent de Rillé 1873; Kosiki, with Liorat, music by Alexandre Charles Lecocq, 1876 and with Albert Vanloo Ali-Baba, 1887.

In 1867 Busnach assumed the direction of the Théâtre de l'Athénée, where several of his operettas (Fleur-de-Thé, etc.) were performed. His greatest successes he achieved, however, with his adaptation of celebrated novels for the stage; for example, L'Assommoir, 1881; Nana, 1882; Pot-Bouille, 1883, all by Émile Zola; Le Petit Jacques, by Jules Claretie, 1885; La Marchande des Quatre Saisons, etc.

Busnach is also the author of the following novels: La Fille de M. Lecoq, 1886; Le Petit Gosse, 1889; Cyprienne Guérard, 1895, etc.

A chapter of Vanloo's memoirs Sur le plateau, Souvenirs d'un librettiste is about Busnach, where Vanloo described his colleague as a jovial, lively man, on close terms with all Paris, and who took delight in using strong language.

References

External links

19th-century French dramatists and playwrights
French theatre managers and producers
French opera librettists
Writers from Paris
1832 births
1907 deaths
Burials at Père Lachaise Cemetery